Chu Feng is the name of:
 Feng Chu (born 1965), Chinese-French operations researcher, written as Chu Feng in eastern name order
 Frances Yao, born Chu Feng
 Zhu Feng, Chu Feng in Wade–Giles